Brent Francis Tremblay (born November 1, 1957 in North Bay, Ontario) is a Canadian retired ice hockey defenceman who was drafted in 1977 by the Washington Capitals.  Tremblay played only 10 games with the Capitals before he retired from professional hockey in 1980.

External links

Profile at hockeydraftcentral.com

1957 births
Living people
Canadian ice hockey defencemen
Franco-Ontarian people
Hershey Bears players
Sportspeople from North Bay, Ontario
Washington Capitals draft picks
Washington Capitals players
Ice hockey people from Ontario